Partido Obrero Revolucionario (Spanish, 'Revolutionary Workers' Party') may refer to:

Revolutionary Workers' Party (Bolivia)
Revolutionary Workers' Party (Peru)
Revolutionary Workers' Party (Spain)
Revolutionary Workers' Party (Uruguay)

See also
 Revolutionary Workers Party (disambiguation)